The Motte of Urr is the remains of a 12th-century motte-and-bailey castle located near the Haugh of Urr in Dumfries and Galloway, Scotland.

History

Walter de Berkeley received Urr in 1165 from William I of Scotland. It was probably Walter who built the motte surrounded by a timber palisade, as the caput of the barony of Urr. In the late 12th century the motte was heightened, possibly after being slighted during the 1174 uprising in Galloway.

The castle and barony passed to the Balliol family in the 13th century. It passed to Ingram de Umfraville, as heir to Ingram de Balliol. Umfraville had adopted the arms of Balliol, as the acknowledged heir. Henry Percy was granted the castle and barony on the forfeiture of Umfraville in 1296 by Edward I of England. The castle appears to have been abandoned after Robert and Edward Bruce’s campaign of 1307-1308 in Galloway. The barony was subsequently split with half invested in the Scottish crown and the other granted to Thomas Randolph, 1st Earl of Moray.

Citations

References

CANMORE - Mote of Urr
ARO31: Brian Hope-Taylor’s archaeological legacy: Excavations at Mote of Urr, 1951 and 1953. GUARD Archaeology Ltd, 2018.

12th-century establishments in Scotland
Castles in Dumfries and Galloway
Demolished buildings and structures in Scotland
Ruined castles in Scotland